The Queen Eleanor Memorial Cross is a memorial to Eleanor of Castile erected in the forecourt of Charing Cross railway station, London, in 1864–1865. It is a fanciful reconstruction of the medieval Eleanor cross at Charing, one of twelve memorial crosses erected by Edward I of England in memory of his first wife. The Victorian monument was designed by Edward Middleton Barry, also the architect of the railway station, and includes multiple statues of Queen Eleanor by the sculptor Thomas Earp. It does not occupy the original site of the Charing Cross (destroyed in 1647), which is now occupied by Hubert Le Sueur's equestrian statue of Charles I.

Barry based the memorial on the three surviving drawings of the Charing Cross, in the Bodleian Library, the British Museum and the collection of the Royal Society of Antiquaries. However, due to the fragmentary nature of this evidence, he also drew from a wider range of sources including the other surviving Eleanor crosses and Queen Eleanor's tomb at Westminster Abbey. In this search for precedents Barry was assisted by his fellow architect Arthur Ashpitel. The coats of arms of England, León, Castile and Ponthieu appear on the monument.

References

External links
 

Grade II* listed buildings in the City of Westminster
Monuments and memorials in London
Monuments and memorials to women
Edward Middleton Barry buildings
1865 establishments in England
Buildings and structures completed in 1865